A Scotch egg is a boiled egg wrapped in sausage meat, coated in breadcrumbs and baked or deep-fried .

Origin

The Oxford English Dictionary gives the first instance of the name as of 1809, in an edition of Maria Rundell's A New System of Domestic Cookery .  The recipe appeared in the first edition of the same book in 1805. They did not, at that time, have a breadcrumb layer, although by 1861 Isabella Beeton suggested this as an option . The Oxford Companion to Food speculates that the origin may be Indian koftas.

As a cold item, the London department store Fortnum & Mason claims to have invented Scotch eggs in 1738, as a traveller's snack, but based this on archival material since lost . Fortnum & Mason certainly popularised Scotch eggs, including the foodstuff as part of various hampers. It is generally believed that Scotch eggs in turn derived from food the British encountered in the Raj, including a Mughlai dish called nargisi kofta ("Narcissus meatballs").

Other claims include the name coming from a nickname used by Londoners who lived around Wellington Barracks after Officers of the Scots Guards stationed there, and who developed a taste for the snack. According to Culinary Delights of Yorkshire, they originated in Whitby, Yorkshire, England, in the 19th century, and were originally covered in fish paste rather than sausage meat. They were supposedly named after William J. Scott & Sons, a well-known eatery which sold them. However, the date does not fit with the known use of the term at least 75 years earlier . It has also been suggested that they were originally called "scorch" eggs, as they were cooked over an open flame, though according to surviving recipes they were deep-fried in lard. 'Scotching' as a culinary process is also sometimes cited as the origin, though what 'scotching' was is open to interpretation, from the inclusion of anchovies to simply mincing meat. Further confusion is added by the large trade in eggs from Scotland in the 19th century, which sometimes involved dipping eggs in a lime powder, a process possibly also known as 'scotching'.

Serving

Scotch eggs are a common picnic food. In the United Kingdom packaged Scotch eggs are available in supermarkets, corner shops and motorway service stations . Miniature versions are also widely available, sold as "mini scotch eggs" "savoury eggs", "picnic eggs", "party eggs", "snack eggs", "egg bites" or similar. These contain chopped egg or a quail's egg, rather than a whole chicken egg, and sometimes contain mayonnaise or chopped bacon .

In the United States, many "British-style" pubs and eateries serve Scotch eggs, usually served hot with dipping sauces such as ranch dressing, hot sauce, or hot mustard sauce . At the Minnesota State Fair Scotch eggs are served on a stick.  Scotch eggs are available at most Renaissance Festivals across the US.

In the Netherlands and Belgium, Scotch eggs may also be called vogelnestje ("little bird's nest"), because they contain an egg, or eierbal ("eggball"). One 1880s Scottish recipe also calls them birds nests.

Regional variations

Several local variations exist. The Manchester Egg uses a pickled egg wrapped in a mixture of pork meat and Lancashire black pudding, and the Worcester Egg uses an egg pickled in Worcestershire sauce and clad in a mixture of local sausage meat and white pudding .

See also
 Deep fried egg

 Farsu magru

 Kwek-kwek, battered hard-boiled eggs popular as street food in the Philippines

 Meatloaf

References

External links

British snack foods
English beef dishes
Deep fried foods
Egg dishes
Fortnum & Mason